Kaisaniemi park is a popular park, in the center of Helsinki, in the region of Kluuvi. The Kaisaniemi Park was named after Catharina "Cajsa" Wahllund. Part of the park was given to the University of Helsinki in 1829, for gardening. The oldest greenhouse was opened in 1889.

In the park, is the oldest public memorial in Helsinki, called Freemason's Grave, there's also a soccer pitch, basketball and tennis courts.

It is a place of several events, including concerts, the World Village event and The Tuska Open Air metal festival, which was held there from 2001 to 2010.
 It usually hosts the Helsinki Day concert. It also hosted the Norwegian pop duo Marcus and Martinus in June 2018.

Pictures from the park

References

External links
virtualhelsinki.fi, Historical tour in Kaisaniemi park
Kaisaniemi WebCam
Helsingin Sanomien korttelisarja
Kotuksen kaupunkinimistön historia

Parks in Helsinki
Monuments and memorials in Finland
Continental gardens in the English Landscape Garden style
Kluuvi